The Honeywell T55 (formerly Lycoming; company designation LTC-4) is a turboshaft engine used on American helicopters and fixed-wing aircraft (in turboprop form) since the 1950s, and in unlimited hydroplanes since the 1980s. Today, there have been more than 6,000 of these engines built. It is produced by Honeywell Aerospace, a division of Honeywell based in Phoenix, Arizona, and was originally designed by the Turbine Engine Division of Lycoming Engines in Stratford, Connecticut, as a scaled-up version of the smaller Lycoming T53. The T55 serves as the engine on several major applications including the CH-47-Chinook, the Bell 309, and the Piper PA-48 Enforcer. The T55 also serves as the core of the Lycoming ALF 502 turbofan. Since the T55 was first developed, progressive increases in airflow, overall pressure ratio, and turbine inlet temperature have more than tripled the power output of the engine.

Variants

Civil and experimental variants
LTC4B-1
LTC4B-7 Ungeared version of the LTC4B-2, with an integral oil cooler and tank; demonstrated  in January 1960; the higher power rating resulted from increased turbine inlet temperatures, which came from small modifications learned from YT55-L-1 and YT55-L-3 development experience; completed 50-hour qualification test at  power rating in February 1960, after which it was designated as the YT55-L-5; completed its 150-hour qualification test in September 1960, after which its designation changed from YT55-L-5 to the T55-L-5 production engine
LTC4B-8 Civil designation for the T55-L-7 military engine; dry weight of  also powered the original Bell 214 helicopter as a  engine in 1970
LTC4B-8D  engine powering the Bell 214A helicopter; uprated from the T55-L-7C; 433 engines produced between 1973 and 1977 for this military helicopter
LTC4B-11similar to L-7 with two-stage gas generator turbine
LTC4C-2 Civil designation for the YT55-L-1A military turboprop engine
LTC4G-4
LTC4K9-stage compressor
LTC4K-2
LTC4M-1
PLF1B-2Turbofan with T55 / LTC4K 9-stage compressor gas generator core
PLF1C-1 Turbofan based on the T55-L-7C turboshaft, producing  of thrust;  length,  fan diameter, 6:1 bypass ratio,  weight, TSFC of 
PLF1C-2 Turbofan based on the T55-L-11 turboshaft, producing  of thrust;  length,  fan diameter, 8.2:1 bypass ratio,  weight, TSFC of 
T5508D Certified September 16, 1975; dry weight ;  engine powering the Bell 214B helicopter, which was produced between 1976 and 1981; 88 engines manufactured for that commercial helicopter; commercial version of the LTC4-8D

Military variants
YT55-L-1A Turboprop version of the YT55-L-3, producing ; length , diameter , dry weight , pressure ratio 6.5:1, air mass flow , BSFC 
T55-L-712  turboshaft engine used on the CH-47D, with production starting in 1978; 849 engines manufactured by 1989
T55-L-714  turboshaft engine used on the MH-47E Chinook SOF
T55-GA-714A  turboshaft engine used on the CH-47F; low-rate initial production started in December 1997
T55-L-714A
5,000 shp (3,729 kW)
T55-GA-714C  turboshaft engine to be tested on an CH-47F testbed aircraft, offering a 25 percent increase in power output and 10 percent reduction in fuel consumption compared to the T55-GA-714A; initial testing of the first engine began in November 2021
T55-L-714C6,000 shp (4,474 kW)
T55-GA-715 A  turboshaft engine upgrade kit proposed in 2008 for a  growth version of the Chinook

HTS7500

Applications
T55/LTC4
 Bell 214
 Bell 309 KingCobra
 Boeing CH-47 Chinook
 Boeing Chinook (UK variants)
 Boeing Model 360
 Boeing RC-135 - One T55 was fitted to the RC-135E variant to provide power to the aircraft's phased array radar.
 Boeing Vertol BV-347
 Curtiss-Wright X-19
 North American YAT-28E Trojan
 Piper PA-48 Enforcer
 Sikorsky–Boeing SB-1 Defiant
 unlimited hydroplanes

HTS7500
 Sikorsky–Boeing SB-1 Defiant X

Specifications (T55-L-714A)

See also

References

Bibliography

External links

 Honeywell T55 page

T55
T55
Mixed-compressor gas turbines
1950s turboshaft engines